Burger Club() is a Ukrainian hamburger fast food chain. Opened in 2008, it operates in three countries in Europe and Asia. These countries are Ukraine, Kazakhstan and Russia.

The company's headquarters are located in Poltava, Ukraine. Most of the restaurants are located in Ukraine. Major Burger Club cities include Kharkiv, Kyiv, Poltava, and Donetsk, among others.

Menu
Burger Club's menu includes burgers, salads, rolls, potato meals, chicken wings, chicken nuggets and many others. The chain also serves many different drinks. These include Coffee, Coca-Cola, fresh made juices, non-alcoholic cocktails, and even beer.

See also
 List of hamburger restaurants
 List of Ukrainian restaurants

External links 
 Archived Old Official website

Ukrainian restaurants
Hamburger restaurants
Restaurants in Ukraine